Curse of the Ruins is the seventeenth novel in World of Adventure series by Gary Paulsen. It was published on February 9, 1998 by Random House.

Plot
The story is about Sam, his thirteen-year-old twin sister, Katie and their cousin Shala who are trying to find their dad who is lost on a New Mexico ruin while escaping danger from bad guys who want to find a secret map, which their dad left them.

Novels by Gary Paulsen
1998 American novels
American young adult novels
Novels set in New Mexico
Random House books